Digrammia was a genus of moths in the family Geometridae erected by Carl Freiherr von Gumppenberg in 1887. It is now often considered a synonym of Semiothisa.

Species
 Digrammia aliceata (Cassino, 1928)
 Digrammia atrofasciata (Packard, 1876)
 Digrammia burneyata (McDunnough, 1939)
 Digrammia californiaria (Packard, 1871) - Californian granite moth
 Digrammia cinereola (Hulst, 1896)
 Digrammia colorata (Grote, 1883) - creosote moth
 Digrammia continuata (Walker, 1862) - curve-lined angle moth
 Digrammia curvata (Grote, 1880)
 Digrammia decorata (Grossbeck, 1907) - decorated granite moth
 Digrammia delectata (Hulst, 1887)
 Digrammia denticulata (Grote, 1883)
 Digrammia equivocata Ferguson, 2008
 Digrammia eremiata (Guenée, 1857) - three-lined angle moth
 Digrammia excurvata (Packard, 1874)
 Digrammia extenuata Ferguson, 2008
 Digrammia fieldi (Swett, 1916)
 Digrammia gilletteata (Dyar, 1904)
 Digrammia gnophosaria (Guenée, 1857) - hollow-spotted angle moth
 Digrammia hebetata (Hulst, 1881)
 Digrammia imparilata Ferguson, 2008
 Digrammia indeterminata (McDunnough, 1939)
 Digrammia irrorata (Packard, 1876)
 Digrammia mellistrigata (Grote, 1873) - yellow-lined angle moth
 Digrammia minuta (Hulst, 1896)
 Digrammia modocata Ferguson, 2008
 Digrammia muscariata (Guenée, 1857)
 Digrammia napensis (McDunnough, 1939)
 Digrammia neptaria (Guenée, 1857) - dark-bordered granite moth
 Digrammia nubiculata (Packard, 1876)
 Digrammia ocellinata (Guenée, 1857) - faint-spotted angle moth
 Digrammia ordinata (Walker, 1862)
 Digrammia pallidata (Packard, 1873)
 Digrammia pallorata Ferguson, 2008
 Digrammia palodurata Ferguson, 2008
 Digrammia pertinata (McDunnough, 1939)
 Digrammia pervolata (Hulst, 1880)
 Digrammia pictipennata (Hulst, 1898)
 Digrammia plemmelata Ferguson, 2008
 Digrammia puertata (Grossbeck, 1912)
 Digrammia rippertaria (Duponchel, 1830)
 Digrammia setonana (McDunnough, 1927)
 Digrammia sexpunctata (Bates, 1886) - six-spotted angle moth
 Digrammia spinata (McDunnough, 1939)
 Digrammia sublacteolata (Hulst, 1887)
 Digrammia subminiata (Packard, 1873)
 Digrammia terramalata Ferguson, 2008
 Digrammia triviata (Barnes & McDunnough, 1917)
 Digrammia ubiquitata Ferguson, 2008
 Digrammia yavapai (Grossbeck, 1907)

References

Macariini